The Limehouse Declaration was a statement issued on 25 January 1981 by four senior British Labour politicians, all MPs or former MPs and Cabinet Ministers: Roy Jenkins, David Owen, Bill Rodgers and Shirley Williams. It became known as the Limehouse Declaration as it was made near David Owen's London home in Limehouse. The four were known as the Gang of Four.

The opening paragraph of the declaration indicates that it was triggered by decisions taken at the Labour Party conference in January 1981.

In this document the so-called 'Gang of Four' signalled their intent to leave the Labour Party and form a Council for Social Democracy, as they felt the party had been taken over by the left-wing members. This Council became the basis for the British Social Democratic Party (SDP).

The declaration was launched on a small bridge on Narrow Street, Limehouse. Organisation was last-minute, with Matthew Oakeshott being sent to the Savoy Hotel to make photocopies of the statement, and visiting the flat of Shirley Williams to find appropriate clothes for her to wear at the press call.

The four stated that they would soon produce an initial list of politicians and others who would support the new Council for Social Democracy. At this point the 'Gang of Three' (Williams, Rodgers and Owen) had not yet left the Labour Party, but Williams admitted that "almost inevitably" they would take this step. However Williams, whom The Glasgow Herald considered  to be the new group's "greatest asset as far as public appeal is concerned",  was reported to want to delay the formal split until after the local elections in May in order to avoid upsetting Labour moderates whose support they hoped to win.

One week later, on 5 February 1981, an advertisement was published in The Guardian under the name of the Council for Social Democracy announcing that they had received 8,000 individual messages of support. The advertisement listed one hundred of their names, which included thirteen former Labour MPs, four of whom had been cabinet ministers including Lord George-Brown, former Deputy Leader of the Labour Party.

The Gang of Four

The list of 100 
Below is the list of 100 Council of Social Democracy supporters whose names were published in the Guardian advertisement of 5 February 1981:

 Austen Albu, former Labour MP
 George Apter, company director
 Michael Barnes, former Labour MP
 Peter Birkby, Chair, Bradford West constituency Labour party (CLP)
 Dick Buchanan, former Labour MP
 Lord Bullock, crossbench peer and historian
 Philip Burgess, university teacher
 Tyrrell Burgess, educationalist
 Alec Cairncross, economist
 George Canning, former Labour Lord Mayor of Birmingham
 John Cannon, historian
 D. L. Carey-Evans, farmer
 Charles Carter, former university vice-chancellor
 Jim Cattermole, former Labour regional organiser
 Frank Chapple, General Secretary, EETPU
 Ann Coulson, former Labour councillor, Birmingham City Council
 Danny Crawford, President, UCATT
 Frederick Dainton, scientist
 Jim Daly, former Labour Greater London Council committee chair
 Richard Davies, administrator
 Edmund Dell, former Labour MP and Cabinet minister
 Lord Diamond, Labour peer and former Cabinet minister
 Lord Donaldson of Kingsbridge, Labour peer and former government minister
 Douglas Eden, polytechnic lecturer and co-founder, Social Democratic Alliance (SDA)
 Geraint Evans, opera singer
 Eddie Fineran, member, ASTMS
 Jean Floud, social scientist
 Lord Flowers, crossbench peer and physicist
 John Frears, Labour councillor, Leicestershire County Council
 Paul Genney, Secretary, Great Grimsby CLP
 Lord George-Brown, former Labour MP and Deputy Leader, and Cabinet minister
 George Godber, former Chief Medical Officer for England and Wales
 John Godfrey, university lecturer
 Celia Goodhart, school teacher
 William Goodhart, barrister
 Frank Hahn, economist
 Willie Hannan, former Labour MP
 Stephen Haseler, polytechnic lecturer and co-founder, SDA
 Eric W. Hawkins, university professor
 Michael Hughes, Secretary, Cardigan CLP
 Sydney Jacobs, former Labour agent and councillor, Liverpool City Council
 Jeffrey Jowell, barrister
 Anthony Lester, barrister
 Clive Lindley, businessman
 Evan Luard, former Labour MP
 Kenneth Lomas, former Labour MP
 Norman MacKenzie, journalist and author
 Anne Mallet, university lecturer
 David Marquand, former Labour MP
 Robert McCullagh, former Labour PPC
 Alec McGivan, Secretary, Campaign for Labour Victory (CLV)
 James Meade, economist
 Stephen Mennell, sociologist
 Anne Mitchell, school teacher
 Joan Mitchell, economist
 John Morgan, writer and broadcaster
 Norman Morris, obstetrician and gynaecologist
 Huw Morris-Jones, university professor
 William Mowbray, former President, Scottish TUC
 Leslie Murphy, businessman
 Richard Murray, former Labour PPC
 Angela Newton, former Labour councillor, South Holland District Council
 Julia Neuberger, rabbi
 Hilda Nickson, Officer, North Norfolk CLP
 David Pannick, barrister
 Lord Perry of Walton, crossbench peer and former university vice-chancellor
 Colin Phipps, former Labour MP
 John Pick, engineer
 Frank Pickstock, former Labour Lord Mayor of Oxford
 Usha Prashar, social administrator
 Frank Price, former Labour Lord Mayor of Birmingham
 Steve Race, composer and pianist
 Dora Radcliffe, member, Bebington CLP
 Michael Rawlins, pharmacologist
 John Riches, school headteacher
 John Rickarby, branch Chair, Lowestoft CLP
 Eirlys Roberts, consumer rights campaigner
 Kenneth Robinson, former Labour MP and Cabinet minister
 Kirby Robinson, Treasurer, Newcastle East CLP
 David Sainsbury, businessman
 Lord Sainsbury, Labour peer and businessman
 Anthony Sampson, author and broadcaster
 Jack Service, General Secretary, CSEU
 Keith Smith, Scottish Organiser, CLV
 Robert Souhami, physician 
 Janet Suzman, actress
 Dick Taverne, former Labour and Democratic Labour MP
 Clem Thomas, rugby journalist and former Liberal parliamentary candidate
 Stuart Thompstone, former Secretary, Newark CLP
 Lady Thomson of Monifieth
 Polly Toynbee, journalist
 Barbara Ward, Baroness Jackson of Lodsworth, crossbench peer and economist
 Jack Watson, Secretary, Argyll CLP
 Clive Wilkinson, Leader, Birmingham City Council
 Philip Williams, political historian and biographer of Hugh Gaitskell
 Peter Wilson, Labour councillor, Lothian Regional Council
 Ian Wright, President, Cambridge Students' Union 
 Lord Young of Dartington, Labour peer and sociologist
 Wayland Young, 2nd Baron Kennet, Labour peer and author
 Michael Zander, legal scholar

Cultural references 
The events leading up to the declaration were the basis of the play Limehouse by Steve Waters at the Donmar Warehouse.

References

Further reading
 Text of the declaration

1981 in British politics
Politics of the United Kingdom
Political manifestos
Social Democratic Party (UK)
1981 in politics
History of the Labour Party (UK)
Limehouse
1981 documents
January 1981 events in Europe